Suzie Jane Clarke (born 1 May 1969), is an English former cricketer who played for England between 1988 and 1993. She appeared in 4 Test matches and 23 One Day Internationals. In 1993, Clarke took the winning wicket in the World Cup final as England won their second title. Her final WODI appearance was in the final of the 1993 Women's Cricket World Cup. She played domestic cricket for East Anglia.

References

External links
 

1969 births
Living people
England women Test cricketers
England women One Day International cricketers
East Anglia women cricketers
Sportspeople from Cambridge